KEXT-CD, virtual channel 27 (UHF digital channel 20), was a low-powered, Class A television station licensed to San Jose, California, United States. The station was owned by the Venture Technologies Group.

History
KEXT began as K27EX, broadcasting to Modesto on channel 27 and receiving that callsign on September 21, 1994. It was owned by Warren L. Trumbly. In 2001, K27EX became KEXT-CA, a Class A station.

After the Class A conversion, Trumbly sold KEXT to Univision in May 2002. The name of the licensee changed to Telefutura Sacramento and later UniMás Sacramento as the station relayed KTFK (channel 64).

In June 2014, two weeks after Univision filed to convert it to digital from a site in San Jose, KEXT was sold by Univision to Central Valley Television for $5,000, plus 30% of the proceeds that might be received by the purchaser as a result of relinquishing the station's license due to a spectrum auction. On August 1, 2014, KEXT's analog signal went off air in order to begin digital construction; it returned to the air two months later and received its license to cover that December.

On April 13, 2017, the Federal Communications Commission (FCC) announced that KEXT-CD was a successful bidder in the spectrum auction; Venture Technologies would be surrendering the station's license in exchange for $55,351,366, 30% of which would be owed to Univision due to the terms of that transaction. Venture Technologies surrendered KEXT-CD's license to the FCC for cancellation on July 31, 2017.

References

External links

EXT-CD
Television channels and stations established in 1996
1996 establishments in California
Low-power television stations in the United States
Defunct television stations in the United States
Television channels and stations disestablished in 2017
2017 disestablishments in California
EXT-CD